Uduike is an Igbo name, in the eastern part of Nigeria. It means fullness of power. It was a name chiefly given to a child born when strength of the child's father could be considered to be in abundance or overflows.

Uduike as an igbo name connotes fulness of power, reveals strength of character, prominence, greatness, influence and dominance in the polity of the then communities. Power is the centre piece of control within the human endeavour and ranked high amongst human accomplishment.

Igbo names